is a Japanese sailor, who specialized in the Laser class. He nabbed a silver medal in men's Laser at the 2006 Asian Games in Doha, Qatar, and was selected to the Japanese sailing team at the 2008 Summer Olympics, finishing thirty-fifth in the process. Throughout his sporting career, Iijima trained for Laser Zuyo Fleet in Kanagawa under his longtime coach Tomoyuki Sasaki.

Born in Tokyo, Iijima burst onto the international sailing scene at the 2006 Asian Games in Doha, Qatar, where he picked up the silver medal in the Laser class with 31 marks, edging out the defending Asian Games champion Kim Ho-kon of South Korea by a close, four-point margin.

At the 2008 Summer Olympics in Beijing, Iijima qualified for the Japanese team in the Laser class after having secured a berth and finishing tenth from the Laser World Championships in Terrigal, New South Wales, Australia. Iijima sailed brilliantly from the start with satisfying marks, but a black flag penalty in the middle leg of the eleven-race series, a disastrous eighth-leg feat, and a cancellation of the last race due to inclement weather dropped him to thirty-fifth in the overall leaderboard with a net grade of 235.

References

External links
 
 
 
 
 Japanese Olympic Team Profile 

1978 births
Living people
Japanese male sailors (sport)
Olympic sailors of Japan
Sailors at the 2008 Summer Olympics – Laser
Asian Games medalists in sailing
Asian Games silver medalists for Japan
Sailors at the 2006 Asian Games
Medalists at the 2006 Asian Games
Sportspeople from Tokyo